The Intruder is an Australian film produced by Frank Howson. The movie had to be abandoned during filming in 1991 due to the financial troubles of Boulevard Films. However the film was completed and released on DVD in 2005.

It was also known as Deliver Us from Evil.

Plot
A married couple return home to find an intruder is in their house. The intruder engages in a series of mind games.

References

External links

Australian thriller films
2005 films
2000s English-language films
2000s Australian films